Latrobe is a town in northern Tasmania, Australia on the Mersey River.  It is 8 km south-east of Devonport on the Bass Highway.  It is the main centre of the Latrobe Council. At the 2006 census, Latrobe had a population of 2,843. By the 2016 census, this had increased to 4,169.
The locality is in the Latrobe Council area, but with a mere 0.1% in the Kentish Council LGA.

History 
The area was first settled by B. B. Thomas in 1826 and, in 1861, the settlement was named for Charles Joseph La Trobe (1801–1875), the administrator of the colony of Tasmania.

La Trobe Post Office opened on 31 August 1860 and was renamed Latrobe in 1873.

Latrobe has a museum based in the old court house.

Facilities 
The Mersey Community Hospital is located in Latrobe. It is approximately a 100-bed hospital that provides services including: ambulatory and emergency, general adult medicine, general paediatric medicine, general surgery including orthopaedic, ear, nose and throat, ophthalmological, certain oncology services, limited rehabilitation services and allied health support. From 1 September 2008, the Hospital is owned by the Commonwealth and operated by the Tasmanian Government.

The main shopping district can be found along Gilbert Street where a number of hotels, cafes, restaurants and shops call home, such as Supa IGA.

Latrobe has a chocolate factory specialising in Belgian chocolates.

There are aged care facilities in Latrobe such as Uniting AgeWell Strathdevon Community.

The Australian Axemans Hall of Fame showcasing Australia’s wood-chopping sporting champions is located on Bells Parade. The Big Platypus, one of Australia's big things, is outside the museum.

Following flooding in 2016, work began on a flood mitigation system for the town involving both a levee and diversion culvert. Construction began in 2022 and is slated to finish in mid 2023.

Sporting activities 
Latrobe's Henley-on-Mersey Regatta held on Australia Day 26 January each year at Belles Parade consists of woodchopping, Ferret racing, Triathlon, Iron Trial Strongman, Boat Race, Cherry Spitting and Gum boot throwing. The Christmas Carnival Series is a series of professional athletics and professional cycling events. The boxing day carnival (26 December) is held at the Latrobe Recreation Ground. This event also stages a woodchopping event. Latrobe Football Club and Latrobe Cricket Club also utilize the Latrobe Recreation Oval. Latrobe Basketball Club play in the North West Basketball Union and play out of the Latrobe and Districts Youth Centre. Tennis is played at the Latrobe Tennis Club. Latrobe has a netball team that competes in the Devon Netball Association.

Latrobe Speedway, a clay race track hosts Sprintcars, Street Stocks, AMCA Nationals, Bombers, Junior Sedans, Formula 500s, Modified Sedans, Karts, Wingless Sedans, Tassie Sixers, Speedcars, Caravan Derby and Demolition Derby.

Education 
Education facilities include Latrobe Primary School, Latrobe High School, St. Patrick’s Catholic School and Geneva Christian College.

Notable people
Darrel Baldock
Dolly Dalrymple
Michael Fieldpolitician
Christine Milnepolitician
Teddy Sheean
James Monaghan Dooley - politician

References

External links

National Trust Tasmania - Images of Latrobe area
Latrobe Primary School
Latrobe High School
St. Patrick’s Catholic School

Localities of Latrobe Council
1826 establishments in Australia